is a video game development and computer graphics studio based in Japan. Their name derives from the Italian words for "art" and "a public square".

History
The company is best known for its involvement in the development of the Dragon Quest series by Enix and later Square Enix. While ArtePiazza was mostly responsible for the CG design and illustrations of some of the early titles, they produced enhanced remakes of others. This includes Dragon Quest V: Hand of the Heavenly Bride for the PlayStation 2, as well as Nintendo DS remakes of Dragon Quest IV: Chapters of the Chosen, Dragon Quest V: Hand of the Heavenly Bride, and Dragon Quest VI: Realms of Revelation.

Other projects besides those based on Square Enix properties include the development of the PlayStation Portable and PlayStation 2 game  Innocent Life: A Futuristic Harvest Moon and the co-production of Koei's Wii title Opoona.

Games

Dragon Quest series
1996: Dragon Quest III (Super Famicom version - CG design/scenario)
2000: Dragon Quest VII (PlayStation - CG design/scenario)
2001: Dragon Quest IV (PlayStation - CG design)
2002: Dragon Quest Characters: Torneko no Daibōken 3 (PlayStation 2 - scenario)
2004: Dragon Quest V: Hand of the Heavenly Bride (PlayStation 2 version)
2007: Dragon Quest IV: Chapters of the Chosen (Nintendo DS version)
2008: Dragon Quest V: Hand of the Heavenly Bride (Nintendo DS version)
2010: Dragon Quest VI: Realms of Revelation (Nintendo DS version)
2013: Dragon Quest VII: Fragments of the Forgotten Past (Nintendo 3DS version)
2017: Dragon Quest Rivals (iOS/Android), Dragon Quest XI: Echoes of an Elusive Age (Nintendo 3DS version (2D mode))
2019: Dragon Quest XI S: Echoes of an Elusive Age - Definitive Edition (2D mode)

Other games
2006: Innocent Life: A Futuristic Harvest Moon (PlayStation Portable/PlayStation 2)
2007: Opoona (Wii)
2010: GO Series: Pinball Attack! (DSiWare)
2010: Accel Knights: Imashi ga Tame Ware wa Tsurugi o Toru (DSiWare)
2010: Arrow of Laputa (DSiWare)
2011: Rikishi (DSiWare)
2016: Romancing SaGa 2 (iOS/Android/PC/Nintendo Switch/PS4/PS Vita/Xbox One versions)
2019: Romancing SaGa 3 (iOS/Android/PC/Nintendo Switch/PS4/PS Vita/Xbox One versions)

References

External links
 Official Artepiazza Website (Japanese)

Video game companies of Japan
Video game companies established in 1989
Video game development companies
Japanese companies established in 1989
Software companies based in Tokyo